Sir John William Maxwell Aitken, 2nd Baronet,  (15 February 1910 – 30 April 1985), briefly 2nd Baron Beaverbrook in 1964, was a Canadian-British fighter pilot and flying ace of the Second World War, a Conservative politician, and press baron. He was the son of The 1st Baron Beaverbrook.

Early life
Aitken was born on 15 February 1910 in Montreal, the son of Gladys Henderson (Drury) and Max Aitken (later Lord Beaverbrook). He was the brother of Janet Gladys Aitken. He was educated at Sandroyd School then Downsend School, Westminster School and Pembroke College, Cambridge. A talented sportsman, he was a university blue at football and a scratch golfer. A keen flyer, he spent some time in the thirties flying throughout Europe and the USA. He joined the Royal Auxiliary Air Force in 1935, and was commissioned a pilot officer on 11 September. He was promoted to flying officer on 14 April 1937.

Military service
On 15 May 1940, Aitken was promoted to flight lieutenant in the Auxiliary Air Force. Aitken served as a Bristol Blenheim and then a Hawker Hurricane pilot with No. 601 Squadron RAF during the early part of the Second World War, becoming commanding officer in June 1940, earning the Distinguished Flying Cross in 1940, and the Distinguished Service Order, in 1942, for eight combat claims. Leaving the squadron on 20 July 1940, he then served as commanding officer of No. 68 Squadron RAF, a night fighter unit, from February 1941 until January 1943, claiming four night victories.

Serving in the Middle East during the middle war years as wing commander, although he was officially non-operational, he managed to shoot down two Junkers Ju 52 aircraft while flying with No. 46 Squadron RAF in Beaufighters.

Aitken became wing leader of the Banff Strike Wing (RAF Coastal Command) in 1944. He reached the rank of group captain, achieving 16 1/2 kills (one a shared aircraft). He did some of his early flying training with Richard Hillary, to whom he was known as Bill, and was featured in Hillary's book The Last Enemy.

Post-war career

In 1946, he entered the family newspaper business, as a director of the Express Group, and would become Chairman of Beaverbrook Newspapers Ltd. At the 1945 general election, Aitken was elected Member of Parliament for Holborn with a majority of 925.

Unfavourable boundary changes meant that the Labour Party took the successor seat in 1950 comfortably and Aitken did not stand at that or subsequent elections. He also served as Chancellor of the University of New Brunswick.

He appears in the famous World War II documentary The World at War giving a variety of interviews, including the episode "Alone in Britain."

Offshore powerboat racing

In the late 1950s, Aitken witnessed one of the early Miami Nassau Offshore Powerboat Races, then participated in the following year with his wife, Lady Violet. It was the experience of this new "sport" that led to his announcement at the 1961 London Boat Show of a similar ocean race to be staged in the south of England in August that year.

Together with John Coote they formulated the rules that saw the birth of the Cowes Torquay Offshore Powerboat Race, with the aim of improving the breed of sea-going fast cruisers and safety at sea.
The Cowes Torquay will celebrate in 2010 the 50th year since Aitken founded it.

London International Boat Show
Aitken, with the sponsorship of his newspaper the Daily Express, helped to found the London International Boat Show in 1954 at the Empire Hall, Olympia.

Family life
Aitken married three times:
 1) Cynthia Monteith, daughter of Colonel H. G. Monteith DSO OBE (1939–1944) (divorced)
 2) Jane Kenyon-Slaney, daughter of Captain Robert Kenyon-Slaney by his wife, Lady Mary Gilmour (1946–1950) (divorced); two daughters (Kirsty and Lynda). Their daughter Kirsty is a close friend of Queen Camilla.
 3) Violet de Trafford, daughter of Sir Humphrey de Trafford (1951–30 April 1985); a son and a daughter (Maxwell and Laura)

He succeeded his father as Baron Beaverbrook on the latter's death on 9 June 1964, but disclaimed the title three days later on 12 June, stating that "there shall only be one Lord Beaverbrook in my lifetime". On his death in 1985, his son, also Max Aitken, took on the title.

References

Bibliography
 Stenton, M., Lees, S. (1981). Who's Who of British Members of Parliament, volume iv (covering 1945–1979). Sussex: The Harvester Press; New Jersey: Humanities Press.

External links
Max Aitken at acesofww2.com
The Sir Max Aitken Museum

British newspaper publishers (people)
Conservative Party (UK) MPs for English constituencies
UK MPs 1945–1950
Beaverbrook, B2
Aitken family
2
Baronets in the Baronetage of the United Kingdom
People educated at Downsend School
People educated at Westminster School, London
People educated at Sandroyd School
Alumni of Pembroke College, Cambridge
Royal Air Force group captains
Royal Air Force pilots of World War II
British World War II flying aces
British Presbyterians
Companions of the Distinguished Service Order
Recipients of the Distinguished Flying Cross (United Kingdom)
1910 births
1985 deaths
Beaverbrook, Max Aitken, 2nd Baron
The Few
Canadian emigrants to the United Kingdom
Canadian people of Scottish descent
English people of Scottish descent